The Rajya Sabha (meaning the "Council of States") is the upper house of the Parliament of India. Tamil Nadu elects 18 seats, and they are indirectly elected by the state legislators of Tamil Nadu. The number of seats allocated to the party is determined by the number of seats a party possesses during nomination and the party.

Summary

Current members
Source: Parliament of India
Keys:
UPA (12) –

NDA (6) –

List of the members of parliament

All India Anna Dravida Munnetra Kazhagam

Dravida Munnetra Kazhagam

INC/INC(O)/TMC/MP list

CPM/CPI MP list

IND/OTHERS MP list

ML/RPI/PMK/JP/MDMK/MP list

 Star (*) Represents current Rajya Sabha members
 Blue: Elected to Rajya Sabha from the Madras State.

See also
Rajya Sabha election in Tamil Nadu, 2013

References

External links
Rajya Sabha homepage hosted by the Indian government
Rajya Sabha FAQ page hosted by the Indian government
Nominated members list
State wise list

Tamil Nadu
Lists of people from Tamil Nadu
 
Rajya Sabha